This is a list of hospitals in the U.S. state of Connecticut, sorted by hospital name.  The American Hospital Directory listed 51 hospitals in Connecticut in 2020.

Hospitals

Defunct
 Cedercrest Hospital (psychiatric) – Newington
 Elmcrest Hospital (psychiatric) – Portland (Saint Francis Hospital and later Hartford Hospital operated psychiatric facilities at the campus following Elmcrest's closure; the site was vacant as of 2014.)
 Hospital of Saint Raphael – New Haven (incorporated into Yale-New Haven Hospital as the Saint Raphael Campus)
 Knight Hospital (psychiatric) – Mansfield (closed in 1993, now part of the Depot Campus of the University of Connecticut
Newington Children's Hospital – Newington (Relocated to Hartford as Connecticut Children's Medical Center)
 Norwich State Hospital (psychiatric)  – Preston
 Park City Hospital (Bridgeport) – Bridgeport
 Seaside Regional Center (psychiatric) – Waterford
 St. Joseph's Medical Center (Stamford) – Stamford (after the hospital building was torn down, the Tully Medical Center of Stamford Hospital was built on the same site)
 Uncas on Thames Hospital  – Norwich (State-owned tuberculous and specialty hospital)
 Winsted Memorial Hospital – Winsted – Emergency department service provided at the site by Charlotte Hungerford Hospital

References

External links
 

 
Connecticut
Hospitals